ZTree or z-Tree may refer to:

 z-Tree programming language, a software tool for experimental economics
 ZTreeWin, an orthodox file manager for Microsoft Windows
 zTree, a plugin for jQuery